Monsechobatrachus is an extinct genus of prehistoric frogs. It is known from a complete but very poorly preserved skeleton from Monsech in Spain.

See also

 Prehistoric amphibian
 List of prehistoric amphibians

References

Prehistoric frogs
Cretaceous amphibians of Europe
Fossil taxa described in 1921